Stefan Aust (born 1 July 1946) is a German journalist. He was the editor-in-chief of the weekly news magazine Der Spiegel from 1994 to February 2008 and has been the publisher of the conservative leading Die Welt newspaper since 2014 and the paper's editor until December 2016.

Early life and education 
Aust was born in Stade, Lower Saxony as son of the farmer Reinhard Aust and his wife Ilse, born Hartig. Together with four siblings he grew up on a small dairy farm which his family ran until the early 1960s. His father emigrated to America at the age of 18 and returned to Germany in the summer of 1939. His grandfather was a merchant and shipowner.

Aust graduated from high school at the Athenaeum in Stade and gained his first journalistic experience working for the local school newspaper "Wir", through which he also got to know the journalist Henryk M. Broder. Aust  dropped out of business studies after a few weeks.

Career

Early career 
Via Wolfgang Röhl, Klaus Rainer Röhl's younger brother, whom he met at the school newspaper, Aust came to the magazine konkret after graduating from high school, where he was initially in charge of the magazines layout. From 1966 to 1969 Aust then worked as an editor for the magazine concrete and later for the St. Pauli-Nachrichten. In 1969, Aust traveled to the United States for half a year.

From 1970 he worked for the Norddeutscher Rundfunk.

Since 2014, he is the publisher of the conservative leading Die Welt newspaper. Until December 2016, he was also the paper's editor.  He was the editor-in-chief of the weekly news magazine Der Spiegel from 1994 to February 2008.

Books
Kennwort 100 Blumen – Verwicklung des Verfassungsschutzes in den Mordfall Ulrich Schmücker. Konkret Literatur Verlag, Hamburg 1980. 
Hausbesetzer: Wofür sie kämpfen, wie sie leben und wie sie leben wollen. Hoffmann und Campe, Hamburg 1981.  (with Sabine Rosenbladt)
Brokdorf: Symbol einer politischen Wende. Hoffmann und Campe, Hamburg 1981. 
Der Baader Meinhof Komplex. Hoffmann und Campe, Hamburg 1985.  (expanded: 1997, ; paperback 1998, ; revised edition 2008)
Werner Mauss – ein deutscher Agent. Hoffmann und Campe, Hamburg 1988.  (revised 1999)
Der Pirat: Die Drogenkarriere des Jan C.. Hoffmann und Campe, Hamburg 1990.  (papareback 2000)
Die Flucht: Über die Vertreibung der Deutschen aus dem Osten. Spiegel-Buchverlag, Hamburg 2002. 
Der Lockvogel: Die tödliche Geschichte eines V-Mannes zwischen Verfassungsschutz und Terrorismus. Rowohlt, Reinbek 2002.  (paperback 2003)
11. September. Geschichte eines Terrorangriffs. DVA, Stuttgart 2002.  (with Cordt Schnibben)
Irak: Geschichte eines modernen Krieges. Spiegel-Buchverlag, Hamburg 2003.  (edited with Cordt Schnibben)
Die Gegenwart der Vergangenheit: Der lange Schatten des Dritten Reichs. DVA, München 2004.  (edited with Gerhard Spörl)
Der Fall Deutschland: Abstieg eines Superstars. Piper, München 2005.  (with Claus Richter, Gabor Steingart, Matthias Ziemann)
Wettlauf um die Welt: Die Globalisierung und wir. Piper, München 2007.  (with Claus Richter, Matthias Ziemann)
Hitler's erster Feind: Der Kampf des Konrad Heiden. Rowohlt, Berlin 2016. 
Xi Jinping. Der mächtigste Mann der Welt. Piper, München-Berlin, 2021 (ISBN 978-3-492-07006-5).

Awards and recognitions 
In 2010 Aust was awarded the Mercator Visiting Professorship for Political Management at the University of Duisburg-Essen's NRW School of Governance. He gave seminars and lectures at the university.

References

External links

Washington Post interview
Interview: Stefan Aust on The Baader-Meinhof Complex
"Interview with Stefan Aust: Author of Baader-Meinhof: The Inside Story of the R.A.F.", Foreign Policy Digest

1946 births
Living people
People from Stade
German male journalists
German journalists
German newspaper journalists
German editors
German male writers
Der Spiegel editors
Die Welt editors
Sat.1 people
Welt am Sonntag editors